Platysepalum is a genus of flowering plants in the legume family, Fabaceae. It belongs to the subfamily Faboideae.
Species in the genus include:
Platysepalum bambidiense Maesen
Platysepalum chevalieri Harms
Platysepalum chrysophyllum Hauman
Platysepalum cuspidatum Taub.
Platysepalum ferrugineum Taub.
Platysepalum hirsutum (Dunn) Hepper
Platysepalum hypoleucum Taub.
Platysepalum inopinatum Harms
Platysepalum poggei Taub.
Platysepalum pulchrum Louis ex Hauman
Platysepalum scaberulum Harms
Platysepalum vanderystii De Wild.
Platysepalum violaceum Welw. ex Baker

References

Millettieae
Fabaceae genera
Taxa named by John Gilbert Baker
Taxa named by Friedrich Welwitsch